The 2007 Dubai 24 Hour was an 24 hour automobile endurance race and the second running of the Dubai 24 Hour. The event was held on 11 to 13 January at the Dubai Autodrome, United Arab Emirates.  The winning car was an A5 class BMW Z4 Coupe run by Duller Motorsport and shared between Jamie Campbell-Walter of the United Kingdom, Austrians Philipp Peter and Dieter Quester and Dirk Werner of Germany.

Result

References

Dubai 24 Hour
Dubai 24 Hour
Dubai 24 Hour